Andreas Volanus (1530 in Poznań – 1610 in Vilnius) was a secretary to the Grand Duke of Lithuania and an eminent Calvinist theologian. Volanus was involved with controversy about both Jesuits and the Ecclesia Minor or Polish Brethren. Fausto Sozzini's De Jesu Christi natura (1584) is a reply to Volanus.

Works
 Caecitas et poena ecclesiae, libellus lectu dignissimus 1608
 Francisci Turriani ... Contra Andream Volanum ... de sanctissima eucharistia ...1577
 Paraenesis Andreae Volani ad omnes in regno Poloniae, Magnoque Ducatu Lituaniæ. 1582
 Andreæ Volani Ad beatissimum patrem, D. Hippolytum Aldebrandinum ... Oratio 1593
 De dignitate ordinis ecclesiastici regni Poloniæ 1582
 De libertate politica 1572

References

1530 births
1610 deaths
Lithuanian Calvinist and Reformed Christians